Pashupata Shaivism is the oldest of the major Shaivite Hindu schools. The mainstream which follows Vedic Pasupata penance are 'Maha Pasupatas' and the schism of 'Lakula Pasupata' of Lakulisa.

There is a debate about pioneership of this schism and the Goan school of Nakulish darshan believes that Nakulish was pioneer and Lakulish and Patanjalinath were his disciples while Gujarat school believes that Nakulish and Lakulish are one. Sarvadarśanasaṅgraha written by Vidyaranya (sometimes also known as Madhavacharya) mentions it as "Nakulish Darshan" not as "Lakulish Darshan". Both sub schools are still active in their own areas. The philosophy of the Pashupata sect was systematized by  also called Nakulīśa) in the 2nd century CE.

Both texts were discovered only in the twentieth century. Prior to that, the major source of information on this sect was a chapter devoted to it in 's .

Date
The date of foundation of the school is uncertain. However, the Pashupatas may have existed from 1st century CE. Gavin Flood dates them to around the 2nd century CE. They are also referred to in the epic Mahabharata which is thought to have reached a final form by the 4th century CE. The Pashupata movement was influential in South India in the period between the 7th and 14th century.

One of the last surviving influential Vedic Pasupata mathas was the Eka Veerambal matha which existed up to the late 18th century administering the Jambukeswarar Temple, Thiruvanaikaval temple near Trichy and the Ramanathaswamy Temple.

Overview

Pashupata Shaivism was a devotional (bhakti) and ascetic movement. Pashu in Pashupati refers to the effect (or created world), the word designates that which is dependent on something ulterior. Whereas, Pati means the cause (or principium), the word designates the Lord, who is the cause of the universe, the pati, or the ruler. To free themselves from worldly fetters Pashupatas are instructed to do a pashupata vrata. Atharvasiras Upanishsad describes the pashupata vrata as that which consists of besmearing one's own body with ashes and at the same time muttering mantra — "Agni is ashes, Vayu is ashes, Sky is ashes, all this is ashes, the mind, these eyes are ashes."

Haradattacharya, in Gaṇakārikā, explains that a spiritual teacher is one who knows the eight pentads and the three functions. The eight pentads of Acquisition (result of expedience), Impurity (evil in soul), Expedient (means of purification), Locality (aids to increase knowledge), Perseverance (endurance in pentads), Purification (putting away impurities), Initiation and Powers are —

The three functions correspond to the means of earning daily food — mendicancy, living upon alms, and living upon what chance supplies.

Philosophy
Pashupatas disapprove of the Vaishnava theology, known for its doctrine servitude of souls to the Supreme Being, on the grounds that dependence upon anything cannot be the means of cessation of pain and other desired ends. They recognize that those depending upon another and longing for independence will not be emancipated because they still depend upon something other than themselves. According to Pashupatas, spirits possess the attributes of the Supreme Deity when they become liberated from the 'germ of every pain'. In this system the cessation of pain is of two kinds, impersonal and personal. Impersonal consists of the absolute cessation of all pains, whereas the personal consists of development of visual and active powers like swiftness of thought, assuming forms at will etc. The Lord is held to be the possessor of infinite, visual, and active powers.

Pañchārtha bhāshyadipikā divides the created world into the insentient and the sentient. The insentient is unconscious and thus independent on the conscious. The insentient is further divided into effects and causes. The effects are of ten kinds, the earth, four elements and their qualities, colour etc. The causes are of thirteen kinds, the five organs of cognition, the five organs of action, the three internal organs, intellect, the ego principle and the cognising principle. These insentient causes are held responsible for the illusive identification of Self with non-Self. The sentient spirit, which is subject to transmigration is of two kinds, the appetent and nonappetent. The appetent is the spirit associated with an organism and sense organs, whereas the non-appetent is the spirit without them.

Union in the Pashupata system is a conjunction of the soul with God through the intellect. It is achieved in two ways, action and cessation of action. Union through action consists of pious muttering, meditation, etc. and union through cessation of action occurs through consciousness.

Rituals

Rituals and spiritual practices were done to acquire merit or puṇya. They were divided into primary and secondary rituals, where primary rituals were the direct means of acquiring merit. Primary rituals included acts of piety and various postures. The acts of piety were bathing thrice a day, lying upon sand and worship with oblations of laughter, song, dance, sacred muttering etc.

See also
 Indian philosophy
 Kashmir Shaivism
 Shaiva Siddhanta

Notes

References

Schools and traditions in ancient Indian philosophy
Āstika
Hindu philosophy
Shaiva sects